The 2006–07 SEC women's basketball season began with practices in October 2006, followed by the start of the 2006–07 NCAA Division I women's basketball season in November. Conference play started in early January 2007 and concluded in March, followed by the 2007 SEC women's basketball tournament at the Arena at Gwinnett Center in Duluth, Georgia.

Preseason

Preseason All-SEC teams

Coaches select 5 players
Players in bold are choices for SEC Player of the Year

Rankings

SEC regular season

Postseason

SEC tournament

Honors and awards

All-SEC awards and teams

References

 
Southeastern Conference women's basketball seasons